The LG Cup Four Nations is an exhibition association football tournament that took place in Iran.

Participants

The participants were:

Venues

Results

Semifinals

Third place match

Final

Scorers
 2 goals
  Ali Daei
 1 goal
  Hossam Hassan
  Karim Bagheri
  Hamed Kavianpour
  Artim Šakiri
  Gjorgji Hristov
  Park Kang-jo
  Choi Chul-woo 
  Park Ji-sung

See also
LG Cup

References

International association football competitions hosted by Iran